Otto Wolgast (c. 1640–1681) was one of the first settlers of Lewes, Delaware in the United States. He was an early magistrate and follower of Mennonite reformer Pieter Corneliszoon Plockhoy at the Dutch colony of the Zwaanendael in the New Netherlands. He would later serve as justice of the peace under the English colonial authorities.

Biography 
Born in Wolgast, Pomerania around 1640, Wolgast traveled to the Netherlands where he became a follower of the early Mennonite preacher Pieter Corneliszoon Plockhoy and traveled to the Dutch colony of the Zwaanendael in present day Delaware in a group of settlers in 1663. Zwaanendael would later be seized and burned by the English and eventually change its name first to the Hoornkil or Horekil, and eventually to Lewes, Delaware, the first city of the first state in America.

Plockhoy, Wolgast and forty other followers arrived at the Hoornkil, present day Lewes, on 28 July 1663, traveling on a Dutch Sloop, the Sint Jacob. Wolgast was the only Pomeranian immigrant to the Dutch Colony of Zwaanendael and would go on to have a profitable and successful life as one of the founders of the town of Lewes, Delaware. Wolgast would be named a magistrate of Lewes by Francis Lovelace, the English governor of New Castle in 1669. Wolgast was also commissioned into the King's service in 1669 and listed as a "Pomeranian who became commissioned at Fort Whorekil" in contemporary records. The Census of 8 May 1671 of the Delaware Colony listed forty-seven people living in the Whorekil. "Otto Wolgast, his wife, one son and one servant" were listed in the census, implying Otto’s household comprised almost one tenth of the settlement at the time.

Otto was present at the Hoornkill in 1673 when the English under Captain Robert Carr took the Zwaanendael colony from the Dutch and burned the Hoorkill to the ground. Carr reported back to his superiors that he had: "Destroyed the Quaking society of Plockhoy to a naile."

In November 1674, Otto was reappointed a magistrate for Lewes, and in June 1675 he was recorded in the early records of the Colony as a "Justice [and] good ordinary planter". Finally in 1680, Sir Edmond Andros, the English Governor of the Dominion of New England appointed Otto Wolgast as "Justice of the Peace at the Whorekill and Dependencies." Otto Wolgast died in May 1681. He is remembered as one of the first settlers in Colonial Delaware, an early magistrate in the colony, and helping to found the city of Lewes in Colonial Delaware.

Legacy 

Otto Wolgast, according to the Delaware Historian J. Thomas Scharf, is the ancestor the of Wilgus family of Rehoboth Beach, Delaware and Salisbury, Maryland.

He is also related to William J. Wilgus, a civil engineer who built several important public buildings in the 19th Century including Grand Central Station in New York, invented the Third Rail system of train electrification, and served in the Allied Expeditionary Force as the chief of rail logistics in the [First World War].

See also

 David Pieterszoon de Vries
 Dutch West India Company
 Lewes, Delaware
 Rehoboth Beach, Delaware
 Salisbury, Maryland
 Sussex County, Delaware
 William J. Wilgus
 Zwaanendael Colony
 Zwaanendael Museum

References 

1640 births
1681 deaths
People of colonial Delaware
People of New Netherland